Ukrainians in Hungary are a small group, numbering at around only 8,000 people, but are notable because of the shared border by Ukraine and Hungary, making them a national minority (one who is native to the nation bordering the one in which they live).

Past history
In 1910, according to the census, Ruthenians formed approx. 470,000 people (4.69% of the population), but this was before the Treaty of Trianon; after which Hungary lost Transcarpathia to Czechoslovakia. This removed virtually almost all Hungarian land inhabited by them and led to the gradual reduction of the community to its present size.

As a result of the First Vienna Award, the southern part of Transcarpathia became part of Hungary again in 1938. After the breakup of Czechoslovakia in 1939, Hungary occupied and annexed the remainder of Carpathian Ruthenia. After the World War II, it was incorporated into the Soviet Union as a part of the province of the Ukrainian Soviet Socialist Republic by the Treaty of Paris in 1947.

The Rusyns descend from Ruthenian peoples who did not adopt the use of the ethnonym "Ukrainian" in the early 20th century. Ukrainians today living in Hungary have Western-Ukrainian and Transcarpathian roots who moved to Hungary in the second half of the 20th century, while Rusyns were a historic minority of the Kingdom of Hungary. In today's Hungary, both Rusyns and Ukrainians are recognized as national minorities, with 3323 and 5633 peoples respectively, according to the 2011 census.

See also 
 Hungary–Ukraine relations
 Hungarians in Ukraine

References

Hungary
Ethnic groups in Hungary
 
Ukrainian diaspora in Europe